Cizario Pinto Lopes da Costa (born November 30, 1998) is a Bissau-Guinean footballer who plays as a midfielder for Benfica Bissau and the Guinea-Bissau national team.

Club career
In January 2017, da Costa signed his first professional contract, agreeing to terms with Miami FC of the North American Soccer League. However, he failed to make a single appearance for the club and left at the conclusion of the season, returning home to join Benfica Bissau.

International career
Da Costa made his senior international debut against Mali on July 27, 2019 during 2020 African Nations Championship qualification.

International statistics

Honours
Benfica Bissau
 Campeonato Nacional: 2017–18
 Taça Nacional: 2018

References

External links
 
 
 

Living people
1998 births
Bissau-Guinean footballers
Guinea-Bissau international footballers
Association football midfielders
Miami FC players
Bissau-Guinean expatriate footballers
Bissau-Guinean expatriate sportspeople in the United States
Expatriate soccer players in the United States